The National Library of Education is a library in the United States serving as a primary resource center for education information. The library provides collections and information services to the public, as well as to the education community and other government agencies on current and historical education programs, activities and publications of the U.S. Department of Education. The library was established in 1995.

Collections
The Library's current collection, in print and electronic formats, focuses on education and includes subject matter such as economics, law, psychology, and sociology, as they relate to education.

The Library maintains an historical collection including some 16,000 government reports on education dating back to 1870, education journals and monographs, and some 16,000 classroom textbooks on a variety of subjects.

Location

The library is located inside the Lyndon Baines Johnson Department of Education Building, which serves as the headquarters of the Department of Education, at 400 Maryland Avenue SW, Washington, D.C., 20202.

See also
Educational attainment in the United States
Education in the United States
National Technical Reports Library
Secretary of Education
United States Department of Education
Department of Education

Further reading
  (fulltext)

References

External links
 National Library of Education

Education
Libraries in Washington, D.C.
United States Department of Education agencies
Libraries established in 1994
1994 establishments in the United States
1994 establishments in Washington, D.C.